Brian Dabul was the defending champion. He lost in the first round to Robby Ginepri. 
2nd seed James Blake defeated 5th seed Bobby Reynolds in the all-American final 6–3, 6–1.

Seeds

Draw

Finals

Top half

Bottom half

References
 Main Draw
 Qualifying Draw

Nielsen Pro Tennis Championship - Singles
2011 Singles